The Missing is a 2015 South Korean television series starring Kim Kang-woo and Park Hee-soon. It aired on OCN on Saturdays at 23:00 for 10 episodes from March 28 to May 30, 2015.

Plot
Gil Soo-hyun is a genius who entered Harvard University at the age of ten. After working for the FBI for a decade, he mysteriously decides to return to Korea, where he gets assigned to lead a special missing persons task force that goes after the 1% toughest unsolved cases.

He becomes partner of Oh Dae-young, a detective with a lot of years of experience in the field and a strong sense of justice. Whereas Soo-hyun is overly analytical, Dae-young goes with his gut feeling. These two characteristics are combined in this series and with their will to serve justice, they book in prison a lot of violent criminals.

Cast

Main
 Kim Kang-woo as Gil Soo-hyun
 Park Hee-soon as Oh Dae-young
 Jo Bo-ah as Jin Seo-joon
 Kim Kyu-chul as Park Jung-do
 Park So-hyun as Kang Joo-young

Supporting
 Woo Ki-hoon as Kim Min-jung
 Yoo Jung-ho
 Jo Yeon-hee as Shin Ji-sub's wife	
 Im Jae-min
 Park Gun-rak
 Yoo Soon-chul
 Lee Seok-gu
 Sung In-ja
 Gong Ho-seok
 Jang Joon-ho
 Ji Sung-geun
 Han Seo-jin as Lee So-yoon
 Kim Byung-chul as Kang Yoon-goo

Guest appearances
 Kang Ha-neul as Lee Jung-soo (ep 1-2)
 Go Bo-gyeol as Kang Soon-young (ep 1-2)
 Jung Woo-sik as Kang Min-chul/Joseph Joo (ep 2)
 Ryu Tae-ho as Kim Seok-gyu (ep 2)
 Lee Seung-hyung as Kim Seok-jin (ep 2)
 Kim Nam-hee as Jailor (ep 2)
 Park Hae-joon as Ha Tae-jo (ep 3-4)
 Son Jong-hak as Ryu Jung-gook (ep 3-4)
 Kim Byung-chul as Kang Yoon-goo (ep 6)
 L.Joe (Teen Top) as Yang Jeong-ho (ep 7)
 Dean Dawson as The Man (ep 10)

Ratings

References

External links
 

OCN television dramas
2015 South Korean television series debuts
Korean-language television shows
South Korean crime television series
South Korean thriller television series
South Korean police procedural television series